Spain is a sovereign state located on the Iberian Peninsula in Southern Europe. It is a middle power and a major developed country with the world's fourteenth largest economy by nominal GDP and sixteenth largest by purchasing power parity. It is a member of the United Nations (UN), the European Union (EU), the Eurozone, the Council of Europe (CoE), the Organization of Ibero-American States (OEI), the North Atlantic Treaty Organization (NATO), the Organisation for Economic Co-operation and Development (OECD), the Schengen Area, the World Trade Organization (WTO) and many other international organisations. Spain has a "permanent invitation" to the G20 summits that occur generally once a year.

For further information on the types of business entities in this country and their abbreviations, see "Business entities in Spain".

Largest firms 
This list displays all 9 Spanish companies in the Fortune Global 500, which ranks the world's largest companies by annual revenue. The figures below are given in millions of US dollars and are for the fiscal year 2018. Also listed are the headquarters location, net profit, number of employees worldwide and industry sector of each company.

Notable firms 
This list includes notable companies with primary headquarters located in the country. The industry and sector follow the Industry Classification Benchmark taxonomy. Organizations which have ceased operations are included and noted as defunct.

See also
List of largest Spanish companies
List of companies based in the Canary Islands

References 

Spain